Reticulon-2 is a protein that in humans is encoded by the RTN2 gene.

This gene belongs to the family of reticulon encoding genes. Reticulons are associated with the endoplasmic reticulum, and are involved in neuroendocrine secretion or in membrane trafficking in neuroendocrine cells. Alternatively spliced transcript variants encoding different isoforms have been identified.

References

Further reading